Yuguo Chen is a Professor of Statistics at the University of Illinois at Urbana-Champaign. His work mainly focuses on Markov chain Monte Carlo algorithms and network analysis.

He received a B.S. in mathematics from University of Science and Technology of China in 1997 and a Ph.D. in Statistics at Stanford University in 2001 under the supervision of Tze Leung Lai and Jun S. Liu. Prior to joining the University of Illinois, he was an assistant professor at the Institute of Statistics and Decision Sciences at Duke University from 2001 to 2005.

Chen was named a Fellow of the American Statistical Association in 2018.

Selected publications
 "State and parameter estimation of hydrologic models using the constrained ensemble Kalman filter". Water Resources Research. 
 "Sequential Monte Carlo Methods for Statistical Analysis of Tables". Journal of the American Statistical Association 100:109–120.

References

External links
 University of Illinois homepage
 

Living people
American statisticians
Stanford University alumni
University of Science and Technology of China alumni
University of Illinois Urbana-Champaign faculty
Year of birth missing (living people)
Fellows of the American Statistical Association